San Lorenzo is a Renaissance-style, Roman Catholic church located on Via Santa Croce 2 corner with Via Luca Pacioli, in Sansepolcro, province of Arezzo, region of Tuscany, Italy. The church is known for its Rosso Fiorentino masterpiece depicting the Deposition.

History
A Benedictine order church of this name was founded outside the city walls in 1350, but the present church, with its arcaded portico, was built in 1556. It was originally affiliated with the Confraternity of Santa Croce. The church was suppressed in the 19th century, and for many years used as a part of an orphanage, where the children learned how to weave textiles.

The main altar has the Rosso Fiorentino altarpiece. Another canvas in the church depicted San Benedetto by Giovanni Battista Mercati.

The canvas of the deposition was commissioned by the Confraternity initially from Raffaellino del Colle. However the Sack of 1527 had exiled Rosso from Rome, and while in Sansepolcro, he was given the commission. The recent events in Rome likely contributed to the painting's dark and turbulent assembly, relative to the painter's prior depiction of the same subject in his Volterra masterpiece. The Sansepolcro Deposition depicts a mob surrounding a cadaverous Christ and his grieving mother, including monstruous or hooded faces in the background; the Volterra painting is more intimate and depicts those struggling with physically lowering the delicate corpse, in addition to those struggling with the emotional impact of the death.

References

16th-century Roman Catholic church buildings in Italy
Renaissance architecture in Tuscany
Roman Catholic churches in Sansepolcro
Roman Catholic churches completed in 1556
1556 establishments in Italy